Björn Phau was the defending champion from the last tournament in 2010, but chose not to compete this year.

Matteo Viola won the title, defeating Filippo Volandri 7–5, 6–1 in the final.

Seeds

Draw

Finals

Top half

Bottom half

References
Main Draw
Qualifying Singles

Canella Challenger - Singles